Plåster (lit. Plaster) is the sixth novel by Swedish author Klas Östergren. It was published in 1986. The novel is about Roland, the night porter, who ends up in hospital after suffering from heart problems. There he meets Yngve, a cigarette dealer who is also a patient. They start talking about the big questions; life, death, friendship and love. When Roland finally manages to take things seriously in his life, he realises that everything may already be too late.

References

External links

1986 Swedish novels
Novels by Klas Östergren
Swedish-language novels
Albert Bonniers Förlag books